Clayton H. W. Hee was a Democratic Party member of the Hawaii Senate, representing the 23rd District from 2004 to 2014 and 1984 to 1988. Hee served as chairman of the state Senate's Judiciary and Labor Committee.

Personal life and education
Hee is half Chinese and half Native Hawaiian. He can speak Hawaiian fluently. Hee is married to Lynne Waters and has two brothers, Albert Hee and Ted Grass. After graduating from Kamehameha Schools and the University of Hawaiʻi, Hee taught at various community colleges and high schools from 1975 until 1981.

Political career
Hee served as state representative from 1982 to 1984 for the district encompassing Molokai, Lanai, and West Maui. From 1984 until 1988, Hee served as the state senator for the district encompassing Kailua to Kaneohe. He was also the chairman of the Judiciary Committee. In 1990, Hee began serving on the board of the Office of Hawaiian Affairs. In 2002, he stepped down from the board to run for Lieutenant Governor of Hawaii, losing in the Democratic primary to Matt Matsunaga. Hee ran successfully for the Hawaii State Senate in 2004. Hee was an unsuccessful candidate for the United States House of Representatives in Hawaii's 2nd congressional district in 2006, finishing 4th in the Democratic primary behind Mazie Hirono, Colleen Hanabusa, and Matt Matsunaga.

In 2018, Hee campaigned for Governor of Hawaii but later withdrew his candidacy. In 2019, Governor Ige appointed Hee to the Hawaii Paroling Authority, subject to state Senate confirmation.

References

External links

Hawaii State Legislature - Senator Clayton Hee official government site
Project Vote Smart - Senator Clayton H.W. Hee (HI) profile
Follow the Money - Clayton Hee
2006 2004 State Senate campaign contributions
2002 Lieutenant Governor campaign contributions
1998 Office of Hawaii Affairs campaign contributions

1953 births
Living people
Democratic Party Hawaii state senators
Kamehameha Schools alumni
Native Hawaiian politicians
University of Hawaiʻi at Mānoa alumni
Hawaii people of Chinese descent
Hawaii politicians of Chinese descent